Making Europe Unconquerable is a book about how civilian-based defense can be incorporated into the foundations of European defense and collective security. Written by Gene Sharp, the book was originally published in the United Kingdom and United States in 1985. Its subtitle was the potential of civilian-based deterrence and defense. The book was reviewed in major newspapers, magazines, and professional journals. Although it advocated a significant departure from existing defense policies, it received a favorable review from George F. Kennan, widely perceived as one of the major architects of the US approach to the cold war. Later in the same year, the book was republished with a foreword from Kennan. It has also been published in Dutch and Italian editions.

Topics covered
In its opening pages, Making Europe Unconquerable states that 

Making Europe Unconquerable contains 7 chapters entitled
 Meeting Europe's defense needs
 Civilian-based defense for Western Europe?
 Transarmament
 Preventing attack
 In face of attack
 Defeating attack
 Assessing the potential
The book also contains a bibliography (12 pages) and an index (24 pages).

Reviews and influence
Reviews have appeared in the 
New York Review of Books, the New York Times, the Bulletin of the Atomic Scientists, Foreign Affairs, International Affairs, Journal of Peace Research, and elsewhere.

In the New York Review of Books, George F. Kennan, widely viewed as a major architect of the US approach to the cold war, wrote that Sharp's "primary purpose in writing the book was... 'to make civilian-based deterrence and defense a thinkable policy which is recognized as meriting further research, policy studies, and an evaluation.' And for this, he makes a reasonably good case." Kennan stated that "the view advanced in this book deserves consideration, if only because of the bankruptcy of all the visible alternatives to it." Kennan viewed Sharp's approach as requiring

Kennan wondered "whether, if this change in political philosophy were to take place, it might not have wider effects than just those that relate to the concepts of national security—whether many other things might not also change, and, in the main, usefully so," and advised that Sharp

In the New York Times, Karl E. Meyer described the book as "reflective," and stated that  "there is considerable merit to [Sharp's] contention that 'all peoples can with effort make themselves politically indigestable to would-be tyrants.'" Meyer also argued that Sharp's approach "has its flaws...  If the stakes are deemed sufficiently vital, civilian resistance seems unlikely to dissuade a determined aggressor."

In Foreign Affairs, Andrew Pierre wrote that 

He added that "The author's proposals go against the grain of mainstream thinking, and to this reviewer leave many questions unanswered, but they are carefully put forward in a nonpolemical manner and clearly merit sustained attention and thought" (p. 873).

Ted Taylor, himself a former designer of nuclear weapons, reviewed the book in the Bulletin of the Atomic Scientists. He quoted Einstein:

He added that "The side effects of pursuing a civilian-based defense strategy are especially interesting, since they tend to be beneficial in peacetime. This is a book that should be read attentively by anyone seriously searching for new ways of thinking about how we can stop our "drift toward unparalleled catastrophe." (p. 56).

Editions
English language editions:
  (250 pages)
  (pbk),  (cased) (xii, 250 pages) 
, with a foreword by George F. Kennan. ,  (xxiv, 190 pages)

Foreign (non-English) language editions:
Dutch: Gene Sharp (1988). Naar een onveroverbaar Europa: de kracht van civiele afschrikking en sociale verdediging (met een voorw. van George F. Kennan; vert. uit het Engels: Peter Kruijt et al.). Antwerpen, Netherlands: Internationale Vredesinformatiedienst, 1988. 
Italian: Gene Sharp (1989). Verso un'Europa inconquistabile (introduzione di G. Pasquino). Bergamo, Italy: Gruppo Abele, 1989. Edizione italiana a cura di Fulvio Cesare Manara. 

See also
Gene Sharp (gives additional explanation of concepts)
The Politics of Nonviolent Action (Sharp's major theoretical work)
Civilian-based defense (the development of the concept)

References

1985 non-fiction books
Civil defense
Nonviolence
Works by Gene Sharp
Harper & Row books